Lake Jacomo  is a  freshwater reservoir located near Blue Springs in Jackson County, Missouri. It is located in the  Fleming Park, which is managed by the Jackson County Parks and Recreation Association.

The idea for the lake began in 1932. The Presiding Judge of Jackson County, Harry S. Truman, requested that a study be done for a potential park. However, nothing was done at that time. It was 20 years later that local voters approved a bond issue to create and develop the lake. Lake Jacomo officially opened on May 30, 1959.

Origin of name 
The lake’s name is an acronym, from Jackson County, MO (Missouri), the county in which it is located.

Recreational activities 
Activities at Lake Jacomo include sailing, sailboat racing, pontoon boating, fishing, and hiking. Common fish found in the lake include crappie, bluegill, largemouth bass, carp, catfish, hybrid striped bass, green sunfish, and walleye.

Marina
Lake Jacomo has a marina open to the public year around.  This marina is the largest boat rental marina in the Kansas City metropolitan area with more than 80 rentals available.

References

 Jackson County Parks and Recreation's Lake Jacomo web site
 50th anniversary of Lake Jacomo
 Lake Jacomo Marina website

1959 establishments in Missouri
Buildings and structures completed in 1959
Reservoirs in Missouri
Buildings and structures in Jackson County, Missouri
Protected areas of Jackson County, Missouri
Kansas City metropolitan area
Bodies of water of Jackson County, Missouri